CommunityNet Aotearoa is an internet resource supporting communities throughout Aotearoa New Zealand.

It was founded in 1998 with support from the Department of Internal Affairs. At its launch, the spokesperson for the steering committee said (inter alia) "We have indeed been fortunate that DIA has taken a hands-off approach and insisted from the very beginning that it would be governed by community. Well done Internal Affairs." The department maintains it as a community service.

Along with case studies, how-to guides, "hot topics", categories of links, and community notices, it offers free weekly or monthly email newsletters.

External links
Official site
Speech Notes by Ross Himona at the Launch of CommunityNet Aotearoa - "Whakataka te hau ki te uru ... "

Internet in New Zealand